Sir James Wycliffe Headlam-Morley, CBE (24 December 1863 – 6 September 1929) was a British academic historian and classicist, who became a civil servant and government advisor on current foreign policy. He was known as James Wycliffe Headlam until 1918, when he changed his surname to Headlam-Morley by royal licence. He was knighted in 1929 for public service.

Family
He was the second son of Arthur William Headlam (1826–1908), vicar of Whorlton, County Durham, and was the younger brother of Arthur Cayley Headlam (1862–1947), Bishop of Gloucester.

In 1893, he married Elisabeth Charlotta Henrietta Ernestina Sonntag (1866–1950), a German musician and composer, also known as Else Headlam-Morley. Historian Agnes Headlam-Morley (1902–1986) was their daughter.

Education and career
He was educated at Eton, King's College, Cambridge, and in Germany where he studied with Treitschke and Hans Delbrück. 
From 1894–1900 he was Professor of Greek and Ancient History at Queen's College, London.

An influential figure, he worked on propaganda in World War I, and, when the war was over, he was involved in the drafting of the Versailles Treaty especially regarding Danzig. He effectively sponsored Arnold J. Toynbee for appointment in 1924 to Chatham House. He also gathered materials on the diplomatic history of the origins of World War I, as an official production of the British government, and contributed to it, though the main editor was Harold Temperley. Historian Anna Cienciala attributes to Headlam and Sidney Edward Mezes, an academic and advisor to Woodrow Wilson and Executive Director of the Inquiry group, the 1919 proposal to make Danzig a free city.

He wrote numerous historical articles for the Encyclopædia Britannica editions of 1902 in 1911, signing them "J.W.He."

Works

 On Election by Lot at Athens (1891); 
 Bismarck and the Foundation of the German Empire (1899) (available online)
 A Short History of Germany and Her Colonies (1914) with Walter Alison Phillips and Arthur William Holland
 The history of twelve days, July 24 to August 4, 1914 (1915)
 The Dead Lands of Europe (1917)
 The German Chancellor and the Outbreak of War (1917)
 The Issue (1917)
 The Peace Terms of the Allies (1917)
 The Starvation of Germany (1917)
 British Documents on the Origins of the War 1898–1914 Volume XI The Outbreak of War Foreign Documents June 28 – August 4, 1914 (1926) editor
 Studies in Diplomatic History (1930)
 A Memoir of the Paris Peace Conference 1919 (1972) edited by Agnes Headlam-Morley, Russell Bryant and Anna Cienciala

References

External links
 
 
 
 The Papers of Sir James Headlam-Morley held at Churchill Archives Centre
 From lecture notes of Anna M. Cienciala, University of Kansas, referring several times to Headlam in relation to post-World War I views of Europe
 Online article on the Molotov-Ribbentrop pact, mentioning Headlam's views in the 1920s

1863 births
1929 deaths
British historians
Alumni of King's College, Cambridge
People from County Durham
Commanders of the Order of the British Empire
Knights Bachelor
People educated at Eton College
Fellows of King's College, Cambridge